A  (ultimately from Proto-Germanic *stapul, "pillar") is a military organization in German-speaking militaries.

Operational unit 

The NATO map symbol for this  is:

Subdivisional unit 

NATO doctrine recognizes this  as a level of command unique to Germany. Fahrzeugstaffel (vehicle squad), Instandsetzungsstaffel (maintenance squad).

The NATO map symbol for this  is:

of the Second World War 

A  usually had nine to twelve aircraft.

References 

Air force units and formations
Military units and formations by size